Luigi Gatti may refer to:

Luigi Gatti (composer) (1740–1817), Italian composer
Luigi Gatti (businessman) (1875–1912), Italian businessman and restaurateur
Luigi Gatti (weightlifter), Italian weightlifter in 1920 Summer Olympics
Luigi Gatti (politician) (1913–1945), Italian politician
Luigi Gatti (nuncio) (born 1946), Italian prelate and diplomat